Charles Marie Friderich (20 March 1828 – 9 January 1880) was a Swiss politician and President of the Swiss National Council (1872).

External links 
 
 

1828 births
1880 deaths
Members of the National Council (Switzerland)
Presidents of the National Council (Switzerland)
Members of the Council of States (Switzerland)